Corbould Park is a locality in the Sunshine Coast Region, Queensland, Australia.

History 
Corbould Park is situated in the Gubbi Gubbi (Kabi) traditional Aboriginal country. 

On 14 June 2019 parts of the localities of Bells Creek and Meridan Plains were excised to create the localities of Banya, Corbould Park, Gagalba and Nirimba to accommodate future suburban growth in the Caloundra South Priority Development Area.

The locality is named after grazier and philanthropist Harold Edward (Ted) Corbould.

Road infrastructure
Caloundra Road runs along part of the northern boundary.

Facilities 
 Corbould Park Racecourse (Sunshine Coast Turf Club)

References 

Suburbs of the Sunshine Coast Region
Localities in Queensland